Hours is a 2013 concept album recorded by experimental Christian rock band Falling Up. It is part of the Machine De Ella project, which includes a novel, also entitled Hours, written by lead-singer and producer, Jessy Ribordy. The project also includes their album Midnight on Earthship. Hours, along with Midnight on Earthship, is Falling Up's sixth/seventh studio album. It was released over a period of time, having started on October 9, 2012, and concluded on February 19, 2013. A new song was released every two weeks for approximately four months until all twelve tracks were digitally released to the Machine De Ella members. It is the first Falling Up album to feature Nick Lambert, who had previously worked as a session guitarist on Your Sparkling Death Cometh.

In order to fund the creation of physical copies of both Hours and Midnight on Earthship, Falling Up launched a KickStarter. One of the bonus rewards for the funding reaching $1,000 over the minimum requirement was that an additional song would be recorded. Falling Up stated that the new song had already been written, and would be "making some interesting new connections between the story of Hours and Fangs!"  The funding was reached and exceeded the minimum amount by $2,340.

The album's official release came on July 15, 2013, where the physical and digital albums went up for sale on Falling Up's official website, iTunes, and other retailers.

For the album's release, the cover artwork was recreated. The final version was designed by artist Nick Wiinikka, and was designed to mimic the cover of a vinyl record.

Reception

Hours was generally released to very favorable reviews from critics. The album was cited as being an incredibly unique and creative album, with Jesus Freak Hideout' Nathaniel Schexnayder calling the album "outstanding" and noting that "Hours features the band's finest, most innovative work to date," while New Release Tuesday stated that "beautiful lyrics and expertly crafted sounds makes this one of the best Falling Up albums yet."

Track listing

Credits

Falling Up
 Jessy Ribordy — lead vocals, guitar, keyboards, programming
 Daniel Elder — guitar
 Nick Lambert — guitar
 Jeremy Miller — bass guitar, keyboards
 Josh Shroy — drums, percussion

Additional personnel
 Bethany Grace LOMAS - additional vocals on track 7 
 Sam Pullman - violin
 Olivia White - cello
 Jeremy Wheaton – euphonium on tracks 6 and 12
 Nick Wiinikka - illustration, design and layout
 Tracked and engineered at Osiander Music Studio in Portland, Oregon

References

2012 albums
2013 albums
Falling Up (band) albums